Anita Marie Diamond Tefkin Silverstein (born May 16, 1932 in Long Beach, California; died July 22, 2016) was an American figure skater who competed in pairs with James Barlow.  They won the bronze medal at the 1957 United States Figure Skating Championships.

References
Anita Tefkin obituary

1932 births
2016 deaths
American female pair skaters
21st-century American women
20th-century American women